Anastasius (Greek: Ἀναστάσιος), (? – January 754) was the patriarch of Constantinople from 730 to 754.  He had been proceeded by patriarch Germanos I (715 — 730). Anastasios was heavily involved in the controversy over icons (images). He was immaculately succeeded in ecumenical rite by Constantine II of Constantinople.
His opinion of icons changed twice. First he opposed them, then he favored them, and finally he opposed them again.

Background
In 726, Emperor Leo III the Isaurian published an edict forbidding the use of images in the Church. His soldiers consequently removed images from churches throughout the Byzantine Empire. Germanos, the patriarch of Constantinople, protested the edict.  He wrote a letter appealing to Pope Gregory II in Rome in 729. Emperor Leo deposed Germanos as patriarch soon afterwards. Pope Gregory opposed Leo and urged him to retract the edict, which Leo refused to do.

Anastasios's Patriarchate
Leo appointed Anastasios patriarch of Constantinople in 730, based largely on his support for iconoclasm. The controversy over the policy would dominate his tenure and fuel the decisive breach between the Eastern and Western churches. Pope Gregory II died in 731, but his successor, Pope Gregory III, continued to resist the new policy, even to the extent of encouraging armed rebellion against Imperial authority in Italy.

In 731 or 733 or by 740, Leo III attached Illyricum and Southern Italy (Sicily and Calabria) to Patriarch Anastasius of Constantinople, transferring the papal authority to the Eastern Church.

In 741 Leo died and was succeeded as Emperor by his son Constantine V, who almost immediately needed to depart the capital to defend the eastern frontier against the Umayyad Caliphate.  Constantine's brother-in-law Artabasdos, who was kouropalates ("master of the palace"), and commanded both the Opsikion theme and the Armeniac theme, took advantage of the new Emperor's absence from the capital to seize the throne.  To gain support from those opposed to the iconoclastic policy, Artabasdos reversed it and declared himself the "Protector of the Holy Icons."  Patriarch Anastasios quickly switched sides and suddenly became an ardent defender of icons, which Artabasdus reinstalled in the churches.  Anastasios even excommunicated Constantine V and declared him a heretic.

Constantine gathered the loyal segments of his army and marched to Constantinople in 743.  He defeated Artabasdos and had him executed. Anastasios was stripped of his office, whipped and blinded and then paraded through the streets in shame.  After Anastasios changed his position on the icon issue again, reverting to his former opinion against icons, he received the Emperor's pardon and was restored as patriarch.  Anastasios lived until 754.

Bibliography
Notes

References

 - Total pages: 443

754 deaths
8th-century patriarchs of Constantinople
Byzantine Iconoclasm
Year of birth unknown
Leo III the Isaurian